Throughout the world there are many museums related to Scouting dedicated to preserving, communicating, and exhibiting the heritage of the Scouting movement for purposes of study, education, and enjoyment of society.  A downloadable world directory of Scouting museums is available from the US Scouting Service Project.

Africa Scout Region 

Baden-Powell museum – Nyeri, Kenya, near Mount Kenya. Baden-Powell's Paxtu cottage, now a small museum, stands on the grounds of the Outspan Hotel. For years it served as a WAGGGS World Center.
Scout Information Centre – Baden Powell's Gravesite, Nyeri, Kenya, near Mount Kenya. This is a fairly modern build which contains a small shop, a board showing badges (many collected during the 2010 World Scout Moot in Kenya) and various neckers (scarfs) from around the World. There are plans to develop it in to a fully fledged museum outlining the history of the association. Talks were under way with National Museums of Kenya to obtain suitable display cases, etc... during 2013. A number of historical items currently held at the Kenya Scout HQs in Rowallan Campsite, Nairobi are likely to be moved into the new museum once it has been completed. This includes a 1st Edition copy of Scouting for Boys.

Asia-Pacific Region

 Scout Museum at the National Training Centre, Mouchak, Gazipur, Bangladesh
 Hong Kong Scout Centre, Austin Road, Kowloon, Hong Kong
 Scout Association of Japan headquarters, Bunkyō, Tokyo, Japan. Museum occupies one floor of the headquarters.  
 Philippine Scout Center (at the back of Manila City Hall), the Philippines
 Manila International Scout Museum (MISM) (Tondo, Manila), the Philippines  
 Discovery Scout Centre, Singapore

Australia
 Tasmanian Scout Heritage Centre, Kingston, Tasmania
 South Australian Scout Archives, Henley Beach, South Australia
 Victorian Scout Heritage Centre, South Yarra, Victoria
  Scouts Queensland Heritage Centre, 'The Wheel House', Baden-Powell Park, Samford, Queensland.
 Baden-Powell House, Perth, Western Australia.
 Queensland Guide Museum, Brisbane, Queensland

New Zealand 
 National Scout Museum, Blue Skies Conference and Training Centre, Kaiapoi, South Island, New Zealand

European Scout Region

Austria
Pfadfindermuseum und Institut für Pfadfindergeschichte, Vienna 
Pfadfindermuseum der Gilde Bruck an der Leitha

Belgium

 Scouts en Gidsen Museum / Musée du Scoutisme et Guidisme, Louvain
 Centre Historique Belge du Scoutisme / Belgische Historische Centrum voor Scoutisme, Brussels
 International Scouting Museum, Arlon

Denmark
 Spejdermuseet Holmen 
 Esbjerg Spejdermuseum 
 Spejdermuseet Århus 
 Stenlændernes Spejdermuseum 
 KFUM-spejdernes korpshistoriske udvalg 
 Sønderjysk Spejdermuseum 
 Tydal Spejdermuseum 
 Silkeborg Spejdermuseum 
 Nordjysk Spejdermuseum 
 De historiske Samlinger, Aalborg 
 KFUK-Spejdermuseum (Randers) 
 Randers Spejdermuseum DDS 
 De Gule Spejderes museum 
 Fyns Spejder- og FDF museum

Finland
 Suomen Partiomuseo – Finlands Scoutmuseum, Turku

France
Musée Scout Réseau Baden-Powell, Thorey-Lyautey

Iceland
Scouting Museum Iceland

Ireland 

 Larch Hill Scout Museum
 Mount Melleray National Scout Museum, Co. Waterford
 Togher Scout Museum, Cork City

Italy 

 Scout Museum, Palermo

The Netherlands
Scouting Nederland Museum, Baarn
Scoutingmuseum Haagse Randstad, The Hague. Traveling museum without a permanent exhibition space.
Scouting Museum "De Ducdalf", Rotterdam

Norway
 Norwegian Guide and Scout museum, Oslo

Poland
 Museum of Scouting, Warsaw
 Olga & Andrzej Małkowski Scouting Museum , Zakopane
 Scouting Museum, Radom

Portugal

 Museu do Corpo Nacional de Escutas (Museu do CNE), Lisboa
 Museu do Escutismo, Dume - Braga
 Centro de Interpretação e Documentação do Escotismo - Museu dos Escoteiros de Portugal, Cova da Piedade - Almada

Slovakia

 Slovakia National Scouting Museum - Skautské múzeum Václava Rubeša v Ružomberku (Václav Rubeš Scouting Museum in Ružomberok),

Sweden

 Kjesäters Scoutmuseum & Archive, Vingåker
 Scoutmuseet, Göteborg
 Scoutmuseet i Malmö
 Nordvästra Skånes Scoutmuseum, Helsingborg

United Kingdom

Baden-Powell House, London.  A basic display and some artefacts.  
Gilwell Park, Chingford, north London.  Closed in the Spring of 2016 as heritage preservation was affected by building lighting and humidity, but reopened before October 2017.
Guide Heritage Centre, London
Be Prepared - Scouting Museum Trust at Waddecar Scout Camp, West Lancashire.
Youlbury Scout Activity Centre Oxfordshire 
Brownsea Island Scout camp, Poole Harbour, Dorset.
 Hertfordshire Scout Museum, Well End.

Interamerican Scout Region

Argentina
 Scout Museum "Baden Powell" - San Francisco, Córdoba
 Scout Museum - Guaymallén,  Mendoza

Brazil
 Cultural Centre of Scout Movement (CCME), Rio de Janeiro

Canada
  Scouts Canada National Museum - Ottawa, Ontario

Mexico
 Museo de Historia Scout - Puebla

United States 

 Arizona Scouting Museum 
 Barbara Anderson Girl Scout Museum, Phoenix, Arizona
 Boyhaven Scouting Museum, Middle Grove, New York
 Central States Scout Museum, Larned, Kansas
 Central States Scout Museum 
 E. Urner Goodman Scout Museum, Owasippe Scout Reservation, Blue Lake Township, Michigan
 Fred H. Poppe Museum, Amarillo, Texas
 George E. Freestone Boy Scout Museum, Provo, Utah
Girl Scout First Headquarters, Savannah, Georgia
 Girl Scout Museum and Archives, Girl Scout Headquarters, New York City, New York
Girl Scouts Heart of the Hudson Archive Museum, Camp Wendy, Wallkill, New York
 Girl Scout Museum at Cedar Hill, Camp Cedar Hill, Waltham, Massachusetts
 Girl Scout Museum at Daisy’s Place, Girl Scouts of Tanasi Council Office, Knoxville, Tennessee
 Girl Scout Museum, Girl Scouts of Northern California, Oakland, California and at Camp Bothin in Fairfax, California
 Girl Scouts of Utah Heritage Museum, Salt Lake City, Utah
 Goodykoontz Museum of Girl Scout History, Houston, Texas
 Gregson Center and Museum, Pipsico Scout Reservation, Spring Grove, Virginia
John Dyer-Hurdon Scout Collection at the Washington Historical Museum, Washington, Michigan
 Las Vegas International Scouting Museum, Las Vegas, Nevada
 Lawrence L. Lee Scouting Museum &  Max I. Silber Scouting Library, Manchester, New Hampshire
 Many Point Scout Camp History Center, Ponsford, Minnesota 
 Miakonda Scouting Museum, Toledo, Ohio
 National Scouting Museum, Philmont Scout Ranch, Cimarron, New Mexico
 Nathan Dauby Scouting Museum, Lake Erie Council, Cleveland, Ohio
 Nathan Hale Heritage Center, June Norcross Webster Scout Reservation, Ashford, Connecticut
 Nawakwa Lodge #3 Museum, Camp T. Brady Saunders, Maidens, Virginia
 New Jersey Scout Museum, Morganville, New Jersey
Nobby Schnabel Museum and Nature Center, Camp Pollock, Cedar Glen, California
 Norman Rockwell Museum at Stockbridge, Massachusetts
 Norman Rockwell Museum of Vermont, Rutland, Vermont
 North East Regional Scout Museum,  Rochelle Park, New Jersey
 North Star Museum of Boy Scouting and Girl Scouting, North St. Paul, Minnesota
 Osage County Historical Museum, Pawhuska, Oklahoma
 Otis H. Chidester Museum, Tucson, Arizona
 Ottawa Scouting Museum, Ottawa, Illinois
Pioneers' Park Museum, Imperial, California
 Samoset Council Archives Room, Crystal Lake Scout Reservation, Rhinelander, Wisconsin
 Scout Heritage Museum, Three Harbors Council, Milwaukee, Wisconsin
 Ten Mile River Scout Museum, Narrowsburg, New York
 Thomas D. Trainor Boy Scout Museum, Metamora, Michigan
 W.C. Moorehead Museum, Camp Tuscazoar, Zoarville, Ohio
 William Hillcourt Scout Museum, Constantia, New York
 World of Scouting Museum, Valley Forge, Pennsylvania
 Worth Ranch Museum, Palo Pinto, Texas

Virtual Museums
 Lawrence L. Smith Scouting Museum and Library, Manchester, New Hampshire
 Scout & Guide Museum page 
 Scouting Milestones Scout History Website

See also 

 Scouting memorials
 Scouting memorabilia collecting

External links

Notes

 
Lists of museums by subject
Scouting-related lists